Ralph Gordon Thompson (born December 15, 1934) is a former United States district judge of the United States District Court for the Western District of Oklahoma.

Education and career

Born in Oklahoma City, Oklahoma, Thompson received a Bachelor of Business Administration from the University of Oklahoma in 1956 and a Juris Doctor from the University of Oklahoma College of Law in 1961. He was a United States Air Force lieutenant from 1957 to 1960. He was a United States Air Force Reserve colonel from 1961 to 1987. He was in private practice in Oklahoma City from 1961 to 1975. He was a member of the Oklahoma House of Representatives from 1966 to 1970. He was assistant minority (Republican) leader from 1966 to 1970 and unsuccessfully ran for the office of Lieutenant Governor of Oklahoma in 1970, losing to incumbent George Nigh. While a Republican had been elected governor in 1962, the first election of a Republican lieutenant governor did not occur until 1994.

Federal judicial service

Thompson was nominated by President Gerald Ford on September 24, 1975, to a seat on the United States District Court for the Western District of Oklahoma vacated by Judge Stephen Sanders Chandler Jr. He was confirmed by the United States Senate on October 9, 1975, and received his commission on October 14, 1975. He served as Chief Judge from 1986 to 1993. He served as a Judge of the United States Foreign Intelligence Surveillance Court from 1990 to 1997. He assumed senior status on December 16, 1999. Thompson served in that capacity until August 6, 2007, when he retired from his position making room for his successor and son-in-law, the newly appointed Judge Timothy DeGiusti. Federal law prohibits close relatives from serving concurrently on the Federal bench.

References

Sources
 

1934 births
Living people
20th-century Members of the Oklahoma House of Representatives
Judges of the United States District Court for the Western District of Oklahoma
United States district court judges appointed by Gerald Ford
20th-century American judges
United States Air Force officers
United States Air Force reservists
Judges of the United States Foreign Intelligence Surveillance Court
Republican Party members of the Oklahoma House of Representatives